Meridian State Park is a state park in Bosque County, Texas, United States.

History
The park opened in 1935, two years after the state acquired the land from private owners. The park's facilities were constructed by the Civilian Conservation Corps.

Recreation

The park has over 5 miles of hiking trails, as well as opportunities for swimming, fishing, and paddling in Lake Meridian. There are various types of campsites, as well as screened shelters and three cabins.

Nature

The park has a wide variety of wildlife. Among its bird species is the endangered golden-cheeked warbler, which nests in Ashe juniper trees during the summer. Fish species in the lake include bream, crappie, catfish, and largemouth bass.

See also
 List of Texas state parks

References

External links

 
 
 Civilian Conservation Corps work on Texas State Parks
 Meridian State Park at The Look of Nature:  Designing Texas State Parks During the Great Depression

State parks of Texas
Protected areas of Bosque County, Texas
Protected areas established in 1935
Civilian Conservation Corps in Texas
1935 establishments in Texas